The 2012–13 Los Angeles Clippers season was the 43rd season of the franchise in the National Basketball Association (NBA), their 35th season in Southern California, and their 29th season in Los Angeles. During the offseason,  the Clippers signed seven-time all-star Grant Hill and re-acquired Lamar Odom from the Dallas Mavericks. They improved on their 40–26 record from the previous season to finish 56–26, and they won their first Pacific Division title in franchise history. The title was clinched after defeating the Los Angeles Lakers on April 7, which also completed a season sweep of their crosstown rivals, 4–0. The franchise had not swept the Lakers since 1974–75, when the Clippers were the Buffalo Braves. It was also the first time in 20 years since 1992–93 that the Clippers won the season series against the Lakers. Although this was enough to net them home-court advantage in a playoff series for the first time in franchise history, they lost their first-round series to the Memphis Grizzlies in six games. Following the season, Hill and Odom both retired and Chauncey Billups re-signed as a free agent with the Detroit Pistons, where he would spend his last season in.

Key dates
 June 28, 2012: The 2012 NBA draft takes place at Prudential Center in Newark, New Jersey.
 December 30, 2012: With a 107–96 victory over the Utah Jazz the Clippers complete only the third 16-0 month in NBA history, after the 1971–72 Los Angeles Lakers and the 1995–96 San Antonio Spurs.
 April 3, 2013:  With a 126–101 victory over the Phoenix Suns, the Clippers notch the first 50-win season in franchise history.
 April 7, 2013:  The Clippers clinch their first division title in franchise history (in Buffalo, San Diego or Los Angeles) with a 109–95 victory over the Lakers.  It also guarantees them home-court advantage in the first round for only the second time ever (since the division champions are guaranteed no worse than the fourth seed).

Draft picks

Future draft picks

Credits
2016 second-round draft pick from Brooklyn
The L.A. Clippers had the right to swap their own 2016 second-round pick with Brooklyn's 2016 second-round pick provided the Clippers' second-round pick was 31–55. If the Clippers' pick was 56–60, Brooklyn's obligations to the Clippers shall be extinguished. (Brooklyn-L.A. Clippers, 7/11/2012)

Debits
2013 second-round draft pick to Detroit
The L.A. Clippers' own 2013 second-round pick to Detroit (top-55 protected in the 2013 Draft). If the Clippers' own 2013 second-round pick was in the top 55 picks, then the Clippers' obligations to Detroit shall be extinguished. [Detroit – L.A. Clippers, February 16, 2009]

2014 second-round draft pick to San Antonio
The L.A. Clippers' own 2014 second-round pick to San Antonio via New Orleans (top-55 protected in the 2014 draft). If the L.A. Clippers' own 2014 second-round pick was in the top 55 picks, then the L.A. Clippers' obligations to San Antonio via New Orleans shall be extinguished. [L.A. Clippers – New Orleans, 1/26/2010 and then New Orleans – San Antonio, October 18, 2010]

2015 second-round draft pick to Houston
The L.A. Clippers' own 2015 second-round pick to Houston via Toronto (if pick is 51–55). If the Clippers' own 2015 second-round pick was not among the 51st through 55th picks, then the Clippers' obligations to Houston shall be extinguished. [L.A. Clippers – Toronto, 1/7/2009 and then Houston – Toronto, July 28, 2010]

2015 second-round draft pick to Denver
The Clippers' own 2015 second-round pick to Denver (top-55 protected in the 2015 draft). If the Clippers' own 2015 second-round pick was in the top 55 picks, then the Clippers' obligations to Denver shall be extinguished. [Denver – L.A. Clippers, 1/5/2009]

2016 second-round draft pick to New Orleans
The Clippers' own 2016 second-round pick to New Orleans (top-55 protected in the 2016 Draft). If the Clippers' own 2016 second-round pick was in the top 55 picks, then the Clippers' obligations to New Orleans shall be extinguished. [L.A. Clippers – New Orleans, 8/12/2009]

Roster

Roster notes
 Forward Lamar Odom becomes the 18th former Laker to play with the crosstown rival Clippers.  This also marks his second tour of duty with the Clippers.  He played for the team from 1999 to 2003
 Forward Matt Barnes becomes the 19th former Laker to play with the crosstown rival Clippers.  He also makes his second tour of duty with the Clippers.  He played for the team in 2004.
 Forward/Center Ronny Turiaf becomes the 20th former Laker to play with the crosstown rival Clippers.

Pre-season

|- style="background:#fcc;"
| 1
| October 6
| Denver
| 
| Eric Bledsoe (25)
| Eric Bledsoe (8)
| Eric Bledsoe (6)
| Mandalay Bay Events Center6,748
| 0–1
|- style="background:#fcc;"
| 2
| October 11
| Miami
| 
| Blake Griffin (19)
| Four players (8)
| Eric Bledsoe (5)
| MasterCard Center17,006
| 0–2
|- style="background:#cfc;"
| 3
| October 14
| @ Miami
| 
| DeAndre Jordan (18)
| Blake Griffin (10)
| Chris Paul (6)
| Mercedes-Benz Arena17,292
| 1–2
|- style="background:#cfc;"
| 4
| October 17
| Utah
| 
| Blake Griffin (23)
| DeAndre Jordan (16)
| Chris Paul (9)
| Staples Center14,617
| 2–2
|- style="background:#fcc;"
| 5
| October 20
| @ Utah
| 
| Matt Barnes (22)
| Ronny Turiaf (10)
| Chris Paul (8)
| EnergySolutions Arena18,741
| 2–3
|- style="background:#cfc;"
| 6
| October 22
| Golden State
| 
| DeAndre Jordan (18)
| DeAndre Jordan (12)
| Chris Paul (9)
| Staples Center14,143
| 3–3
|- style="background:#cfc;"
| 7
| October 24
| L. A. Lakers
| 
| Eric Bledsoe (22)
| DeAndre Jordan (7)
| Eric Bledsoe (11)
| Staples Center19,060
| 4–3
|- style="background:#cfc;"
| 8
| October 25
| @ Denver
| 
| Blake Griffin (25)
| Blake Griffin (11)
| Chris Paul (12)
| Pepsi Center13,406
| 5–3

Regular season

Game log

|- style="background:#cfc;"
| 1 || October 31 || Memphis
| 
| Jamal Crawford (29)
| Griffin & Jordan (7)
| Chris Paul (12)
| Staples Center19,060
| 1–0

|- style="background:#cfc;"       
| 2 || November 2 || @ L. A. Lakers
| 
| Jamal Crawford (18)
| Blake Griffin (8)
| Chris Paul (15)
| Staples Center18,997
| 2–0
|- style="background:#fcc;"       
| 3 || November 3 || Golden State
| 
| Crawford & Paul (27)
| Blake Griffin (11)
| Chris Paul (10)
| Staples Center19,060
| 2–1
|- style="background:#fcc;"       
| 4 || November 5 || Cleveland
| 
| Blake Griffin (20)
| Matt Barnes (8)
| Chris Paul (9)
| Staples Center19,060
| 2–2
|- style="background:#cfc;"       
| 5 || November 7 || San Antonio
| 
| Blake Griffin (22)
| DeAndre Jordan (11)
| Chris Paul (12)
| Staples Center19,060
| 3–2
|- style="background:#cfc;"       
| 6 || November 8 || @ Portland
| 
| Jamal Crawford (25)
| Blake Griffin (10)
| Chris Paul (6)
| Rose Garden20,425
| 4–2
|- style="background:#cfc;"       
| 7 || November 11 || Atlanta
| 
| Blake Griffin (16)
| Matt Barnes (7)
| Chris Paul (8)
| Staples Center19,060
| 5-2
|- style="background:#cfc;"       
| 8 || November 14 || Miami
| 
| Jamal Crawford (22)
| Blake Griffin (14)
| Chris Paul (10)
| Staples Center19,146
| 6-2
|- style="background:#cfc;"       
| 9 || November 17 || Chicago
| 
| Blake Griffin (26)
| Blake Griffin (10)
| Chris Paul (10)
| Staples Center19,060
| 7-2
|- style="background:#cfc;"       
| 10 || November 19 || @ San Antonio
| 
| Chris Paul (19)
| Blake Griffin (12)
| Chris Paul (8)
| AT&T Center17,920
| 8-2
|- style="background:#fcc;"       
| 11 || November 21 || @ Oklahoma City
| 
| Blake Griffin (23)
| DeAndre Jordan (10)
| Chris Paul (9)
| Chesapeake Energy Arena18,203
| 8-3
|- style="background:#fcc;"       
| 12 || November 23 || @ Brooklyn
| 
| Griffin & Paul (14)
| DeAndre Jordan (13)
| Chris Paul (9)
| Barclays Center17,732
| 8-4
|- style="background:#fcc;"       
| 13 || November 24 || @ Atlanta
| 
| Blake Griffin (22)
| Blake Griffin (11)
| Griffin & Paul (7)
| Philips Arena16,024
| 8-5
|- style="background:#fcc;"       
| 14 || November 26 || New Orleans
| 
| Caron Butler (33)
| Matt Barnes (8)
| Chris Paul (8)
| Staples Center19,060
| 8-6
|- style="background:#cfc;"      
| 15 || November 28 || Minnesota
| 
| Chris Paul (23)
| Griffin, Barnes & Jordan (6)
| Chris Paul (11)
| Staples Center19,060
| 9-6

|- style="background:#cfc;"       
| 16 || December 1 || Sacramento
| 
| Jamal Crawford (17)
| Blake Griffin (9)
| Jamal Crawford (6)
| Staples Center19,060
| 10-6
|- style="background:#cfc;"       
| 17 || December 3 || @ Utah
| 
| Blake Griffin (30)
| Blake Griffin (11)
| Chris Paul (9)
| EnergySolutions Arena19,067
| 11-6
|- style="background:#cfc;"       
| 18 || December 5 || Dallas
| 
| Jamal Crawford (20)
| Blake Griffin (13)
| Chris Paul (13)
| Staples Center19,060
| 12-6
|- style="background:#cfc;"      
| 19 || December 8 || Phoenix
| 
| Blake Griffin (20)
| Griffin, Odom & Barnes  (8)
| Chris Paul (11)
| Staples Center19,060
| 13-6
|- style="background:#cfc;"       
| 20 || December 9 || Toronto
| 
| Blake Griffin (19)
| DeAndre Jordan (10)
| Eric Bledsoe (6)
| Staples Center19,060
| 14-6
|- style="background:#cfc;"
| 21 || December 11 || @ Chicago
| 
| Blake Griffin (22)
| Griffin & Jordan (10)
| Jamal Crawford (5)
| United Center21,571
| 15-6
|- style="background:#cfc;"       
| 22 || December 12 || @ Charlotte
| 
| Barnes, Griffin & Paul (19)
| Lamar Odom (9)
| Chris Paul (10)
| Time Warner Cable Arena16,786
| 16-6
|- style="background:#cfc;"       
| 23 || December 15 || @ Milwaukee
| 
| Matt Barnes  (21)
| Griffin & Jordan (11)
| Chris Paul (13)
| BMO Harris Bradley Center13,691
| 17-6
|- style="background:#cfc;"       
| 24 || December 17 || @ Detroit
| 
| Griffin & Crawford (15)
| Lamar Odom (11)
| Chris Paul (7)
| The Palace of Auburn Hills13,560
| 18-6
|- style="background:#cfc;"       
| 25 || December 19 || New Orleans
| 
| Blake Griffin (18)
| Lamar Odom (6)
| Chris Paul (12)
| Staples Center19,188
| 19-6
|- style="background:#cfc;"       
| 26 || December 21 || Sacramento
| 
| Chris Paul (24)
| Blake Griffin (13)
| Chris Paul (13)
| Staples Center19,060
| 20-6
|- style="background:#cfc;"       
| 27 || December 23 || @ Phoenix
| 
| Blake Griffin (23)
| Blake Griffin (11)
| Chris Paul (13)
| US Airways Center14,741
| 21-6
|- style="background:#cfc;"       
| 28 || December 25 || Denver
| 
| Jamal Crawford (22)
| Lamar Odom (10)
| Chris Paul (8)
| Staples Center19,346
| 22-6
|- style="background:#cfc;"       
| 29 || December 27 || Boston
| 
| Matt Barnes  (21)
| Lamar Odom (13)
| Chris Paul (11)
| Staples Center19,552
| 23-6
|- style="background:#cfc;"       
| 30 || December 28 || @ Utah
| 
| Chris Paul (29)
| Blake Griffin (13)
| Chris Paul (6)
| EnergySolutions Arena19,911
| 24-6
|- style="background:#cfc;"       
| 31 || December 30 || Utah
| 
| Caron Butler (29)
| Blake Griffin (7)
| Chris Paul (9)
| Staples Center19,111
| 25-6

|- style="background:#fcc;"       
| 32 || January 1 || @ Denver
| 
| Griffin & Bledsoe (12)
| DeAndre Jordan (11)
| Chris Paul (6)
| Pepsi Center19,155
| 25-7
|- style="background:#fcc;"       
| 33 || January 2 || @ Golden State
| 
| Jamal Crawford (24)
| Lamar Odom (9)
| Chris Paul (6)
| Oracle Arena19,596
| 25-8
|- style="background:#cfc;"       
| 34 || January 4 || L. A. Lakers
| 
| Chris Paul (30)
| DeAndre Jordan (9)
| Chris Paul (13)
| Staples Center20,179
| 26-8
|- style="background:#cfc;"       
| 35 || January 5 || Golden State
| 
| Chris Paul (27)
| Jordan & Barnes (8)
| Chris Paul (9)
| Staples Center19,323
| 27-8
|- style="background:#cfc;"       
| 36 || January 9 || Dallas
| 
| Paul & Barnes (19)
| Blake Griffin (13)
| Chris Paul (16)
| Staples Center19,362
| 28-8
|- style="background:#fcc;"      
| 37 || January 12 || Orlando
| 
| Blake Griffin (30)
| Blake Griffin (8)
| Chris Paul (16)
| Staples Center19,060
| 28-9
|- style="background:#cfc;"       
| 38 || January 14 || @ Memphis
| 
| Crawford & Barnes (16)
| Matt Barnes  (8)
| Blake Griffin (5)
| FedExForum15,837
| 29-9
|- style="background:#cfc;"       
| 39 || January 15 || @ Houston
| 
| Jamal Crawford (30)
| Lamar Odom (11)
| Blake Griffin (8)
| Toyota Center16,823
| 30-9
|- style="background:#cfc;"
| 40 || January 17 || @ Minnesota
| 
| Jamal Crawford (22)
| Lamar Odom (12)
| Lamar Odom (6)
| Target Center16,198
| 31-9
|- style="background:#cfc;"
| 41 || January 19 || Washington
| 
| Chris Paul (22)
| Blake Griffin (11)
| Chris Paul (11)
| Staples Center19,188
| 32-9
|- style="background:#fcc;"
| 42 || January 21 || @ Golden State
| 
| Blake Griffin (26)
| Blake Griffin (13)
| Chris Paul (9)
| Oracle Arena19,596
| 32-10
|- style="background:#fcc;"
| 43 || January 22 || Oklahoma City
| 
| Blake Griffin (31)
| Blake Griffin (11)
| Blake Griffin (5)
| Staples Center19,451
| 32-11
|- style="background:#fcc;"
| 44 || January 24 || @ Phoenix
| 
| Jamal Crawford (21)
| Lamar Odom (11)
| Crawford & Odom(4)
| US Airways Center16,017
| 32-12
|- style="background:#fcc;"
| 45 || January 26 || @ Portland
| 
| Blake Griffin (24)
| Eric Bledsoe (9)
| Blake Griffin (10)
| Rose Garden20,672
| 32-13
|- style="background:#cfc;"
| 46 || January 27 || Portland
| 
| Blake Griffin (23)
| Lamar Odom (13)
| Blake Griffin (9)
| Staples Center19,060
| 33-13
|- style="background:#cfc;"
| 47 || January 30 || @ Minnesota
| 
| Blake Griffin (26)
| Blake Griffin (13)
| Eric Bledsoe (10)
| Target Center15,312
| 34-13

|- style="background:#fcc;"
| 48 || February 1 || @ Toronto
| 
| Blake Griffin (17)
| Griffin & Jordan (9)
| Jamal Crawford (5)
| Air Canada Centre19,800
| 34-14
|- style="background:#fcc;"
| 49 || February 3 || @ Boston
| 
| Bledsoe & Crawford (23)
| Blake Griffin (11)
| Eric Bledsoe (10)
| TD Garden18,624
| 34-15
|- style="background:#fcc;"
| 50 || February 4 || @ Washington
| 
| Jamal Crawford (28)
| DeAndre Jordan (22)
| Eric Bledsoe (9)
| Verizon Center16,246
| 34-16
|- style="background:#cfc;"
| 51 || February 6 || @ Orlando
| 
| Eric Bledsoe (27)
| DeAndre Jordan (14)
| Lamar Odom (4)
| Amway Center17,995
| 35-16
|- style="background:#fcc;"
| 52 || February 8 || @ Miami
| 
| DeAndre Jordan (17)
| DeAndre Jordan (6)
| Eric Bledsoe (6)
| American Airlines Arena19,902
| 35-17
|- style="background:#cfc;"
| 53 || February 10 || @ New York
| 
| Jamal Crawford (27)
| Blake Griffin (12)
| Chris Paul (7)
| Madison Square Garden19,033
| 36-17
|- style="background:#cfc;"
| 54 || February 11 || @ Philadelphia
| 
| Chris Paul (21)
| DeAndre Jordan (10)
| Chris Paul (11)
| Wells Fargo Center17,550
| 37-17
|- style="background:#cfc;"
| 55 || February 13 || Houston
| 
| Blake Griffin (20)
| Blake Griffin (11)
| Chris Paul (11)
| Staples Center19,251
| 38-17
|- style="background:#cfc;"
| 56 || February 14 || @ L. A. Lakers
| 
| Chris Paul (24)
| DeAndre Jordan (12)
| Chris Paul (13)
| Staples Center18,997
| 39-17
|- align="center"
|colspan="9" bgcolor="#bbcaff"|All-Star Break
|- style="background:#fcc;"       
| 57 || February 21 || San Antonio
| 
| Matt Barnes (18)
| Blake Griffin (8)
| Jamal Crawford (6)
| Staples Center19,343
| 39-18
|- style="background:#cfc;"       
| 58 || February 23 || Utah
| 
| Caron Butler (21)
| DeAndre Jordan (12)
| Chris Paul (7)
| Staples Center19,165
| 40-18
|- style="background:#cfc;"      
| 59 || February 26 || Charlotte
| 
| Blake Griffin (24)
| Caron Butler (7)
| Chris Paul (13)
| Staples Center19,060
| 41-18
|- style="background:#cfc;"      
| 60 || February 28 || @ Indiana
| 
| Chris Paul (29)
| Blake Griffin (14)
| Chris Paul (8)
| Bankers Life Fieldhouse18,165
| 42-18

|- style="background:#cfc;"      
| 61 || March 1 || @ Cleveland
| 
| Jamal Crawford (24)
| Blake Griffin (11)
| Chris Paul (15)
| Quicken Loans Arena20,562
| 43-18
|- style="background:#fcc;"      
| 62 || March 3 || Oklahoma City
| 
| Chris Paul (26)
| Blake Griffin (9)
| Chris Paul (8)
| Staples Center19,371
| 43-19
|- style="background:#cfc;"       
| 63 || March 6 || Milwaukee
| 
| Jamal Crawford (25)
| Blake Griffin (11)
| Blake Griffin (11)
| Staples Center19,060
| 44-19
|- style="background:#fcc;"      
| 64 || March 7 || @ Denver
| 
| Matt Barnes (19)
| Lamar Odom (10)
| Chris Paul (10)
| Pepsi Center18,857
| 44-20
|- style="background:#cfc;"      
| 65 || March 10 || Detroit
| 
| Blake Griffin (22)
| Blake Griffin (8)
| Chris Paul (14)
| Staples Center19,344
| 45-20
|- style="background:#fcc;"       
| 66 || March 13 || Memphis
| 
| Chris Paul (24)
| Lamar Odom (8)
| Chris Paul (9)
| Staples Center19,316
| 45-21
|- style="background:#cfc;"       
| 67 || March 17 || New York
| 
| Chris Paul (20)
| Blake Griffin (12)
| Chris Paul (8)
| Staples Center19,412
| 46-21
|- style="background:#fcc;"       
| 68 || March 19 || @ Sacramento
| 
| Blake Griffin (26)
| DeAndre Jordan (9)
| Chris Paul (15)
| Power Balance Pavilion13,563
| 46-22
|- style="background:#cfc;"     
| 69 || March 20 || Philadelphia
| 
| Chris Paul (16)
| Blake Griffin (8)
| Chris Paul (7)
| Staples Center19,187
| 47-22
|- style="background:#cfc;"      
| 70 || March 23 || Brooklyn
| 
| Chris Paul (29)
| DeAndre Jordan (12)
| Chris Paul (11)
| Staples Center19,506
| 48-22
|- style="background:#fcc;"      
| 71 || March 26 || @ Dallas
| 
| Chris Paul (33)
| DeAndre Jordan (11)
| Chris Paul & Jamal Crawford (5)
| American Airlines Center20,291
| 48-23
|- style="background:#cfc;"       
| 72 || March 27 || @ New Orleans
| 
| Blake Griffin (19)
| DeAndre Jordan (11)
| Chris Paul (9)
| New Orleans Arena15,128
| 49-23
|- style="background:#fcc;"      
| 73 || March 29 || @ San Antonio
| 
| Blake Griffin (18)
| DeAndre Jordan (8)
| Chris Paul (12)
| AT&T Center18,581
| 49-24
|- style="background:#fcc;"       
| 74 || March 30 || @ Houston
| 
| Chris Paul (19)
| Ryan Hollins (8)
| Chris Paul (7)
| Toyota Center18,303
| 49-25

|- style="background:#fcc;"   
| 75 || April 1 || Indiana
| 
| Jamal Crawford (25)
| Lamar Odom (10)
| Chris Paul (8)
| Staples Center19,384
| 49-26      
|- style="background:#cfc;"   
| 76 || April 3 || Phoenix
| 
| DeAndre Jordan (20)
| DeAndre Jordan (12)
| Chris Paul (12)
| Staples Center19,137
| 50-26
|- style="background:#cfc;"   
| 77 || April 7 || L. A. Lakers
| 
| Paul & Griffin (24)
| DeAndre Jordan (13)
| Chris Paul (12)
| Staples Center19,768
| 51-26
|- style="background:#cfc;"      
| 78 || April 10 || Minnesota
| 
| Blake Griffin (19)
| Lamar Odom (13)
| Chris Paul (11)
| Staples Center19,060
| 52-26
|- style="background:#cfc;"       
| 79 || April 12 || @ New Orleans
| 
| Blake Griffin (20)
| Matt Barnes (10)
| Chris Paul (14)
| New Orleans Arena15,206
| 53-26
|- style="background:#cfc;"       
| 80 || April 13 || @ Memphis
| 
| DeAndre Jordan (16)
| DeAndre Jordan (12)
| Chris Paul (5)
| FedExForum18,119
| 54-26
|- style="background:#cfc;"       
| 81 || April 16 || Portland
| 
| Caron Butler (22)
| Lamar Odom (12)
| Chris Paul (11)
| Staples Center19,183
| 55-26
|- style="background:#cfc;"       
| 82 || April 17 || @ Sacramento
| 
| Chris Paul (25)
| DeAndre Jordan (10)
| Chris Paul (11)
| Sleep Train Arena17,317
| 56-26

Playoffs

Game log

|- style="background:#cfc;"
| 1
| April 20
| Memphis
| 
| Chris Paul (23)
| DeAndre Jordan (8)
| Chris Paul (7)
| Staples Center19,339
| 1-0
|- style="background:#cfc;"
| 2
| April 22
| Memphis
| 
| Mike Conley (28)
| Tony Allen (10)
| Chris Paul (9)
| Staples Center19,570
| 2-0
|- style="background:#fcc;"
| 3
| April 25
| @ Memphis
| 
| Zach Randolph (27)
| Zach Randolph (11)
| Mike Conley (10)
| FedExForum19,596
| 2–1
|- style="background:#fcc;"
| 4
| April 27
| @ Memphis
| 
| Zach Randolph (24)
| Marc Gasol (13)
| Mike Conley (13)
| FedExForum19,596
| 2–2
|- style="background:#fcc;"
| 5
| April 30
| Memphis
| 
| Chris Paul (35)
| Zach Randolph (11)
| Mike Conley (6)
| Staples Center19,657
| 2-3
|- style="background:#fcc;"
| 6
| May 3
| @ Memphis
| 
| Matt Barnes (30)
| Matt Barnes (10)
| Chris Paul (8)
| FedExForum19,596
| 2-4

Standings

Injuries and surgeries

Transactions

Trades

Free agents

Re-signed

Additions

Subtractions

References

Los Angeles Clippers seasons
Los Angeles Clippers